Rosanna railway station is located on the Hurstbridge line in Victoria, Australia. It serves the north-eastern Melbourne suburb of Rosanna, and opened on 1 October 1927.

History
Opening on 1 October 1927, Rosanna station, like the suburb itself, was named after Elizabeth Anna Rose, the wife of James Watson, who purchased land in the area in 1838 when the Warringal village was divided in nine portions of varying sizes. Watson later named his land "Rosa Anna farm".

In 1958, in conjunction with the duplication of the line between Rosanna Junction (which was located at the up end of the station) and Macleod, flashing light signals replaced wigwags at the former Lower Plenty Road level crossing, which was located at the down end of the station. In 1972, boom barriers were provided. Three years later, in 1975, new station buildings were provided.

On 6 October 2017, the former ground level station closed, as part of the removal of the Lower Plenty Road level crossing and the duplication of the Hurstbridge line between Rosanna and Heidelberg. On 4 May 2018, a new, elevated station opened.

Platforms and services
Rosanna has two side platforms. It is served by Hurstbridge line trains.

Platform 1:
  all stations and limited express services to Flinders Street

Platform 2:
  all stations and limited express services to Macleod, Greensborough, Eltham and Hurstbridge

Transport links
Dysons operates three bus routes via Rosanna station, under contract to Public Transport Victoria:
 : Eltham station – Glenroy station (via Lower Plenty)
 : Eltham station – Glenroy station (via Greensborough)
 : Northland Shopping Centre – St Helena

Gallery

References

External links
 
 Melway map

Railway stations in Melbourne
Railway stations in Australia opened in 1927
Railway stations in the City of Banyule